Rancho San Joaquin (also called "Rosa Morada") was a  Mexican land grant in present day San Benito County, California given in 1836 by Governor Nicolás Gutiérrez to Cruz Cervantes.  The grant was located north east of  present day Hollister and was bounded on the north by Rancho Ausaymas y San Felipe, on the south by Rancho Santa Ana y Quien Sabe, on the west by Santa Ana Creek, and on the east by the hills.

History
Cruz Cervantes (1796–1875) received the two square league Rancho San Joaquin or Rancho Rosa Morada in 1836.

With the cession of California to the United States following the Mexican-American War, the 1848 Treaty of Guadalupe Hidalgo provided that the land grants would be honored.  As required by the Land Act of 1851, a claim for Rancho San Joaquin was filed with the Public Land Commission in 1852, and the grant was confirmed by the Commission.  The United States unsuccessfully appealed to the US Supreme Court and the grant was patented to Cruz Cervantes in 1874.

Cruz Cervantes gave a one tenth  interest in the Rancho to William Carey Jones (1814–1867) who represented him before the Land Commission. Jones had been appointed by the United States Secretary of the Interior in 1849, to investigate the validity of California's land grants. Cervantes sold to Rancho to Flint, Bixby & Co in 1863.

See also
Ranchos of California
List of ranchos of California

References

External links
  Diseno del Rancho San Joaquin, at The Bancroft Library

California ranchos
San Joaq
San J